The Roman Catholic Diocese of Baucau is a diocese located in the city of Baucau in Timor-Leste.

History
 November 30, 1996: Established as the Diocese of Baucau from the Diocese of Díli

When the diocese was  started there were only 21 priests plus a number of nuns from several religious congregations  to serve about 200,000 Catholics. In 2018 there were 150 young men from Baucau Diocese studying in seminaries.

Leadership
Bishops of Baucau (Roman rite)
 Bishop Basilio do Nascimento (Apostolic Administrator, 30 November 1996 – 6 March 2004)
 Bishop Basilio do Nascimento (6 March 2004 – 30 October 2021)

Current events
Bishop Basilio do Nascimento launched Radio Fini Lorosae (eastern future radio), the new radio station set up by Baucau diocese, on March 20, 2006 following a Mass held at St. Anthony Cathedral to mark the diocese's ninth anniversary. The station office is located just 100 meters from the cathedral. Baucau Vicar General Father Francisco da Silva and Father Jose Antonio, the cathedral parish priest, concelebrated the anniversary Mass.

On 19 May 2007 President Alexander Xanana Gusmão awarded the Dom Martinho da Costa Lopes Medal to Father Mario do Carmo Lemos Belo, former vicar general of the Baucau diocese and several deceased Catholic clergy and Religious in recognition of their contributions to the liberation of the country.

In 2009 the government gave US$1.5 million to two dioceses in East Timor  — Dili and Baucau, which they are to receive annually  “to run social programs for people”. Poverty remains a massive problem since independence in 2002, with about half of the 1 million population unemployed and 45 per cent living on less than US$1 a day.

On 23 June 2016 the blessing and dedication of the new St John de Brito chapel took place in Cairui in Baucau, built with project support from Catholic Mission (Australia).

The Maria Auxiliadora Medical Clinic run by the Salesians of Don Bosco in the town of Venilale,  has been serving the residents of Venilale and 13 surrounding villages for many years. In 2014, the clinic cared for more than 7,300 patients focusing on the care of mothers and babies.

References

External links
 GCatholic.org
 Catholic Hierarchy
 papal bull - papal bull of 30 November 1996 establishing the diocese of Baucau, accessed from vatican.va (bull published in the Acta Apostolicae Sedis vol. LXXXIX (1997), n. 2, p. 86)

Roman Catholic dioceses in East Timor
Christian organizations established in 1996
Roman Catholic dioceses and prelatures established in the 20th century
Baucau
1996 establishments in Indonesia